Middle Town is a small settlement on the island of St Agnes. It includes the island's primary school, post office and general store, and the old lighthouse (built 1680).

References

Hamlets in the Isles of Scilly
St Agnes, Isles of Scilly